List of bodies of water called sound is an overview of all waterbodies with sound as part of the name.

Australia 
Broad Sound near Clairview, Queensland
Camden Sound at Kuri Bay, Western Australia
Cockburn Sound, Western Australia
Denham Sound, part of Shark Bay in Western Australia
King George Sound at Albany, Western Australia
King Sound at Derby, Western Australia
Montague Sound, near Bigge Island, Western Australia
Noosa Sound, Shire of Noosa, Queensland, built in 1970
York Sound, Western Australia
Capel Sound, Mornington Peninsula, Victoria

Bahamas 
Exuma Sound, bordered by Eleuthera, Cat Island and Great Exuma, among others
Millars Sound, New Providence
North Sound, Bimini
Rock Sound, Eleuthera

Bermuda 
Great Sound, towards the island's northwest end
Little Sound, part of Great Sound
Harrington Sound, towards the northeast end

British Virgin Islands 
North Sound, Virgin Gorda
South Sound, Virgin Gorda

Canada 
Amet Sound on the northern coast of Nova Scotia on the Northumberland Strait
Barkley Sound on the west coast of Vancouver Island, British Columbia
Baynes Sound between Denman Island and Vancouver Island, British Columbia
Chatham Sound, off the North Coast of British Columbia
Clayoquot Sound in Vancouver Island, British Columbia
Cumberland Sound in Baffin Island's east coast
Desolation Sound between the Discovery Islands and the coast of British Columbia
Tasiujaq between Baffin Island and Bylot Island in Nunavut
Eureka Sound between Ellesmere Island and Axel Heiberg Island in Nunavut
Fitz Hugh Sound on the Central Coast of British Columbia
Hamilton Sound between Fogo Island and the Island of Newfoundland
Howe Sound, an inlet northwest of Vancouver, British Columbia
Jones Sound between Devon Island and Ellesmere Island in Nunavut
Kyuquot Sound on the west coast of Vancouver Island, British Columbia
Lancaster Sound between Devon Island and Baffin Island in Nunavut
Mackenzie Sound in Broughton Archipelago of the Queen Charlotte Strait region
Massey Sound between Amund Ringnes Island and Axel Heiberg Island in Nunavut
Nansen Sound between Ellesmere Island and Axel Heiberg Island in Nunavut
Newman Sound in Terra Nova National Park, Newfoundland and Labrador
Nootka Sound on the west coast of Vancouver Island, British Columbia
Northumberland Sound between Maclean Strait and Norwegian Bay, Nunavut
Owen Sound in Ontario
Parry Sound in Ontario
Peel Sound between Prince of Wales Island and Somerset Island in Nunavut
Quatsino Sound on northern Vancouver Island
Queen Charlotte Sound off British Columbia
Random Sound near Clarenville in Newfoundland and Labrador
Roes Welcome Sound between Southampton Island and Hudson Bay's west shore in Nunavut
 Severn Sound in Ontario
Viscount Melville Sound between Banks Island and Melville Island in Nunavut

Cayman Islands 
Frank Sound on Grand Cayman
Little Sound on Grand Cayman
North Sound on Grand Cayman
South Hole Sound on Little Cayman
South Sound on Grand Cayman

Chile 
 Almirantazgo Sound
 Darwin Sound in Tierra del Fuego
 Otway Sound between Brunswick Peninsula and Riesco Island
 Reloncaví Sound
 Skyring Sound
 Última Esperanza Sound in the Magallanes Basin

Falkland Islands 
Adventure Sound in East Falkland
Berkeley Sound in East Falkland
Byron Sound in West Falkland
Choiseul Sound in East Falkland
Falkland Sound between East Falkland and West Falkland

France 
 The Sound of Chausey

Germany 
 Fehmarn Sound
 Strelasund

Republic of Ireland 
 Achill Sound, that separates Achill Island from the mainland
 Dursey Sound, that separates Dursey Island from the mainland
 Ballycotton Sound, that separate the islands from the mainland

Mexico 
Campeche Sound in Campeche

New Zealand 

"The Marlborough Sounds" is a local term for a complex of bays and inlets on the northern tip of the South Island, which comprises three main sounds:
Kenepuru Sound
Pelorus Sound / Te Hoiere
Queen Charlotte Sound / Tōtaranui 

Much further south, there are many fiords in the southwestern corner of the South Island incorrectly named as sounds, which collectively make up the coast of Fiordland National Park. From north to south, they are:

Milford Sound / Piopiotahi 
Te Hāpua / Sutherland Sound
Hāwea / Bligh Sound
Te Houhou / George Sound
Taitetimu / Caswell Sound
Taiporoporo / Charles Sound
Hinenui / Nancy Sound
Te Awa-o-Tū / Thompson Sound
Kaikiekie / Bradshaw Sound
Doubtful Sound / Patea
Te Rā / Dagg Sound
Te Puaitaha / Breaksea Sound
Tamatea / Dusky Sound
Moana-whenua-pōuri / Edwardson Sound (an arm of Taiari / Chalky Inlet)
Te Korowhakaunu / Kanáris Sound (an arm of Taiari / Chalky Inlet)
Isthmus Sound (an arm of Rakituma / Preservation Inlet)
Te Awaroa / Long Sound (an extension of Rakituma / Preservation Inlet)

Philippines 
Dinagat Sound, separates the islands of Dinagat and Siargao
Malampaya Sound, in the Province of Palawan

Scandinavia 
On the coasts of (western) Baltic Sea and Norway there are more than a hundred straits named "Sund" (the Scandinavian and German version of "sound"), mostly in connection with the name of the island they divide from the continent or a mainland.
Alssund, strait between Als and Jutland in Denmark
Drøbak Sound, separates the Norwegian cities of Drøbak and Hurum in the Oslofjord
Prince Christian Sound in Southern Greenland
Scoresby Sound, a fjord system on the eastern coast of Greenland
Svendborgsund, strait separating the islands of Funen and Tåsinge in Denmark
Øresund, sometimes translated into English as the Sound, a body of water between Sweden and Denmark

Solomon Islands 
New Georgia Sound in the New Georgia Islands region

United Kingdom 
Calf Sound between the Isle of Man and the Calf of Man
Heigham Sound, connected by Candle Dyke to the River Thurne, Norfolk
Plymouth Sound in Plymouth, Devon
See also: Sounds of Scotland.

United States 

Albemarle Sound in North Carolina
Anna Maria Sound in Florida
Back Sound in eastern North Carolina
Block Island Sound between Block Island and mainland Rhode Island
Bogue Sound in North Carolina
Breton Sound in Louisiana
Broad Sound near Boston, Massachusetts
Calibogue Sound in South Carolina
Chandeleur Sound between mainland Louisiana and the Chandeleur Islands
Core Sound between the mainland of Carteret County and Core Banks
Croatan Sound in Dare County, North Carolina
Cross Sound in Alaska
Currituck Sound in North Carolina and Virginia
Frederick Sound in the Alexander Archipelago in Southeast Alaska
Fishers Island Sound between Fishers Island, New York and Connecticut
Hobe Sound in Florida
Kotzebue Sound in Alaska
Long Island Sound between Long Island, New York and Connecticut
Mississippi Sound in Mississippi and Alabama
Nantucket Sound off Nantucket, Massachusetts
Norton Sound in Alaska
Ossabaw Sound near Savannah, Georgia
Pamlico Sound in North Carolina
Pine Island Sound near Cape Coral, Florida
Plum Island Sound in Plum Island, Massachusetts
Port Royal Sound in Beaufort County, South Carolina
Prince William Sound in Alaska
Puget Sound in Washington
Rhode Island Sound off Rhode Island
Roanoke Sound in North Carolina
St. Catherine's Sound in Liberty County, Georgia
Saint Helena Sound near Beaufort, South Carolina
Salem Sound near Salem, Massachusetts
St. George Sound in Appalachicola Bay, Florida
St. Simons Sound in Glynn County, Georgia
Salisbury Sound in the Alexander Archipelago in Southeast Alaska
Santa Rosa Sound in the Florida Panhandle
Sitka Sound near Sitka, Alaska
Somes Sound in Mount Desert Island, Maine (arguably a fjard)
Tangier Sound in Maryland & Virginia on Chesapeake Bay
Vineyard Sound off Martha's Vineyard, Massachusetts
Wassaw Sound near Savannah, Georgia

United States Virgin Islands 
Pillsbury Sound between Saint Thomas and Saint John

References

External links

 
Bodies of water
Coastal and oceanic landforms